2022 in professional wrestling describes the year's events in the world of professional wrestling.

Beginning in March 2020, the COVID-19 pandemic severely affected the professional wrestling industry worldwide, with many promotions presenting shows behind closed doors. Some events were canceled while others were rescheduled to occur in 2021 and then some in 2022. Larger companies such as All Elite Wrestling and WWE resumed live touring with full-capacity crowds in July 2021—further companies also began readmitting fans to events in 2022.

List of notable promotions
These promotions held notable shows throughout 2022.

Calendar of notable shows

January

February

March

April

May

June

July

August

September

October

November

December

Notable events
January 5 – AEW Dynamite premiered on TBS
January 8 – All Elite Wrestling's quarterly Battle of the Belts premiered on TNT
January 8 – NWA USA premiered on YouTube
January 26 – Ring of Honor announced the creation of the ROH Hall of Fame
February 15 – WWE's 205 Live brand ceased operations
February 18 – WWE NXT Level Up premiered on Peacock and the WWE Network, replacing WWE 205 Live
March 2 – All Elite Wrestling President and Chief Executive Officer Tony Khan acquired Ring of Honor separately from AEW
March 3 – WWE Network and all WWE programming terminated in Russia due to worldwide sanctions in the wake of the invasion of Ukraine.
April 1 – Ring of Honor returned after a hiatus with Supercard of Honor XV
May 16 – Jim Crockett Promotions, which was purchased by Turner Broadcasting System in 1988, was revived and held Ric Flair's Last Match on July 31.
July 22 – Vince McMahon retired as Chairman and Chief Executive Officer of WWE; McMahon had served in these positions since 1982.
 July 29 – New Japan Pro-Wrestling and World Wonder Ring Stardom, both owned by entertainment company Bushiroad, announced the creation of the IWGP Women's Championship. The inaugural champion was crowned at the Historic X-Over joint event on November 20.
 September 4 – Worlds Collide was the final event for WWE's NXT UK brand before taking a hiatus and relaunching as NXT Europe in 2023.

Accomplishments and tournaments

2AW

AAA

AJPW

AEW

BJW

The Crash

CMLL

DDT

TJPW

GanPro

DG

Gleat

GCW

IWRG

Impact

NJPW

Noah

M-Pro

Zero1

Stardom

MLW

NWA

WWE

Title changes

AJPW

2AW

AAA

AEW

BJW

The Crash

CMLL

DG

Gleat

GanPro

TJPW

GCW

DDT

Impact

IWRG

MLW

M-Pro

Zero1

Noah

Stardom

NJPW

NWA

ROH

WWE
 – Raw
 – SmackDown
 – NXT
 – NXT UK
 – Unbranded

Raw and SmackDown
Raw and SmackDown each have a world championship, a secondary championship, a women's championship, and a male tag team championship.

NXT

NXT UK

Unbranded
These titles are not brand exclusive. The colors indicate the home brand of the champions (names without a color are former WWE wrestlers, Hall of Famers, or non-wrestlers).

Awards and honors

AAA

AAA Hall of Fame

AEW

AEW Awards

GCW

Indie Wrestling Hall of Fame

Deathmatch Hall of Fame

George Tragos/Lou Thesz Professional Wrestling Hall of Fame

Hardcore Hall of Fame

Impact

Impact Hall of Fame

Impact Year End Awards

International Professional Wrestling Hall of Fame

NJPW

NJPW Concurso (Best Body)

Pro Wrestling Illustrated

ROH

ROH Hall of Fame

St. Louis Wrestling Hall of Fame

Wrestling Observer Newsletter

Wrestling Observer Newsletter Hall of Fame

Wrestling Observer Newsletter awards

WWE

WWE Hall of Fame

NXT Superstar of the Year

Debuts
March 11 – Miyu Amasaki
April 2 – Logan Paul
October 23 – Fuwa-chan

Retirements

February 13 – Tank Nagai (2012–2022)
March 20 – LiLiCo (2014–2022)
March 25 – Triple H (1992–2022) 
March 26
Reika Saiki (2016–2022)
Nodoka Tenma (2015–2022)
April 7 – K-ness (1996–2022)
May 4 – Tsukushi Haruka (2010–2022)
May 15 – Devon Nicholson (2001–2022)
May 31 - Kim Duk (August 30, 1968-May 31, 2022) 
July 22 – Vince McMahon (1969–2022)
July 31 – Ric Flair (1972–2008, 2009–2012, 2022)
August 5 – Aiden English (2011–2022)
August 8 – Kaoru (1986–2022)
August 14 – Gamma (1996–2022)
September 24 – Akira Hyodo (2018–2022)
November 9 – Taryn Terrell (2007–2022)
November 27 – Ricky Steamboat (1976-1994, 2009-2010, 2022)
December 11 – Jamie Noble (1995–2015, 2022)
December 31 – Yuki Mashiro (2019–2022)

Deaths

 January 7 – Dee Booher (born 1948)
 January 18 – Angel (Andrea Michelli) (born 1963) 
 February 1 - Don Brinton (born 1928) 
 February 8 – Ricky Hunter (born 1936)
 February 9 
Candi Divine (born 1959)
Super Muñeco (born 1962)
Arturo "Rudo" Rivera (born 1954)
 February 14 – Mickie Henson (born 1963)
 February 28 – Black Man (born 1949)
 March 7 – Dan Mirade (born 1979)
 March 9
Joe D'Orazio (born 1922)
Caveman Broda (born 1953) 
 March 14 – Scott Hall (born 1958)
 March 17 – Black Warrior Jr. (born 1997)
 March 18 – Pepper Martin (born 1936)
 March 27 – Rocky King (born 1958)
 April 4 – Raziel (born 1973)
 April 21 – Adam Windsor (born 1981)
 April 25 – Toro Bill Jr. (born 1981) 
 May 21 – Nikolai Zouev (born 1958)
 May 29 – Tarzan Goto (born 1963)
 June 17 – Dave Hebner (born 1949)
 June 19 – Tim White (born 1954)
 July 6 – Masashi Aoyagi (born 1956)
 July 28 – Gil Hayes (born 1939)
 August 8 - Mike Masters (wrestler) (born 1954) 
 August 9 – Gene LeBell (born 1932)
 August 24 – Howard Brody (born 1960) 
 August 26 – Goro Tsurumi (born 1948)
 August 29 – Bill Ash (born 1946)
 September 10 – Bubba Monroe (born 1960) 
 September 23 – Starman (born 1974) 
 October 1 – Antonio Inoki (born 1943)
 October 6 – Sara Lee (born 1992)
 October 12 – Katsuya Kitamura (born 1985)
 November 8 – Karl Von Steiger (born 1934) 
 November 19 – Farmer Brooks (born 1957)
 December 3 – Ursula Hayden (born 1966)
 December 22 – Stephan Bonnar (born 1977)
 December 29 – Jaysin Strife (born 1985)
 December 30:
Don West (born 1963)
Johnny Powers (born 1943) 
 December 31 – Mike Pappas (born 1941)

See also 
 List of WWE pay-per-view and WWE Network events, WWE Raw special episodes, WWE SmackDown special episodes, and WWE NXT special episodes
 List of AEW pay-per-view events and AEW special events
 List of Impact Wrestling pay-per-view events and Impact Plus Monthly Specials
 List of NJPW major events and NJPW Strong special episodes
 List of World Wonder Ring Stardom major events
 List of major Pro Wrestling Noah events
 List of major DDT Pro-Wrestling events
 List of ROH pay-per-view events
 List of NWA pay-per-view events
 List of MLW events

References 

 
professional wrestling